La Braye (1,788 m) is a mountain of the Chablais Alps, located west of Torgon in the canton of Valais. It is the easternmost summit on the chain descending from Le Linleu.

References

Mountains of the Alps
Mountains of Valais
Mountains of Switzerland
One-thousanders of Switzerland